Harry Joseph Apted (30 April 1925 – 8 April 2016) was a Fijian cricketer. He was a left-handed batsman who bowled slow left arm orthodox.

Apted made his first-class debut for Fiji in 1948 against Auckland during Fiji's tour of New Zealand. From 1948 to 1954 he played 9 first-class matches for Fiji, with his final first-class appearance coming against Auckland during Fiji's 1953/54 tour of New Zealand.

In his 9 first-class matches for Fiji he scored 497 runs at a batting average of 27.61, with four half centuries and a high score of 97 against Auckland in 1948. With the ball he took 5 wickets at a bowling average of 27.80, with best figures of 2/36. In the field he took 19 catches for Fiji.

Apted also represented Fiji in 76 non first-class matches from 1948 to 1968, including a match against the touring West Indians. Apted's final match for Fiji came in 1968 against Northland.

In 2008, Apted was inducted into the Fiji Sports Hall of Fame. He died in April 2016.

External links
Harry Apted at Cricinfo
Harry Apted at CricketArchive

References

1925 births
2016 deaths
Sportspeople from Suva
Fijian cricketers
Fijian people of Welsh descent